This article is a list of the all-time owners and executives for the San Diego Padres, a Major League Baseball (MLB) club based in [[San Diego|San Diego, California

Owners
 C. Arnholt Smith 1969-1974
 Ray Kroc 1974-1984
 Joan Kroc 1984-1990
 Tom Werner 1990-1996
 John Moores 1996-2009
 Jeff Moorad 2009-2013
 Ron Fowler 2013-2021
 Peter Seidler 2013-2023

General Managers

Other executives
 Sandy Alderson
 Buzzie Bavasi
 Mike Dee
 Paul DePodesta
 Larry Doughty
 Theo Epstein
 Chub Feeney
 Billy Herman
 Sandy Johnson
 Larry Lucchino
 Jeff Moorad
 Jim Skaalen
 Reggie Waller

External links
Baseball America: Executive Database

Lists of Major League Baseball owners and executives
Owners and executives